Lawangan is an Austronesian language of the East Barito group. It is spoken by about 100,000 Lawangan people (one of the Dayak peoples) living in the central Kalimantan, Indonesia. Lawangan has a high degree of dialectal diversity.

Phonology

Consonants

Vowels

References

Further reading

 

East Barito languages
Languages of Indonesia